The yellow-eared barbet (Psilopogon australis) is an Asian barbet native to Java and Bali.

Bucco australis was the scientific name proposed by Thomas Horsfield in 1821 who described a barbet from Java with yellow cheeks and breast.

References

External links 

yellow-eared barbet
Birds of Java
Birds of Bali
yellow-eared barbet